Nizah Hukić (born 23 February 1969) is a Bosnian football manager and former player. He has both played for and managed Bosnian club Čelik Zenica.

Playing career
Born in Zenica, SFR Yugoslavia, present day Bosnia and Herzegovina, Hukić played for his hometown club Čelik Zenica during the 1990s. He won two league titles and one cup with the club, being one of its main players during that time. Hukić finished his playing career at Čelik.

Managerial career

Čelik Zenica
After years of being an assistant manager, Hukić became the new manager of Čelik Zenica on 30 October 2013, though only as a caretaker at first, after former manager Vlado Jagodić got sacked. After making good results, he signed a full-time contract with Čelik on 1 December 2013. In his first season as the club's manager, Hukić guided Čelik to a decent 7th-place finish in the league and to the 2013–14 Bosnian Cup final in which Čelik lost against Sarajevo in both matches of the final. In the next season however, things did not look good at the start, and Hukić resigned from his position as manager after a 1–0 home loss against Drina Zvornik on 27 September 2014.

Personal life
On 19 March 2018, Hukić suffered a heart attack and was rushed to a hospital in Sarajevo where he had a successful surgery in which three stents were built-in his heart.

Career statistics

Club

Managerial statistics

Honours

Player
Čelik Zenica
First League of Bosnia and Herzegovina: 1995–96, 1996–97
Bosnian Cup: 1995–96

Manager
Čelik Zenica
Bosnian Cup runner-up: 2013–14

References

External links
Nizah Hukić at Soccerway

1969 births
Living people
Sportspeople from Zenica
Association football midfielders
Bosnia and Herzegovina footballers
NK Čelik Zenica players
Premier League of Bosnia and Herzegovina players
Bosnia and Herzegovina football managers
NK Čelik Zenica managers
Premier League of Bosnia and Herzegovina managers